Ouattara is a surname or given name, and may refer to:

Surname 
 Aboubakar Diaby Ouattara (born 1938), Ivorian diplomat
 Alassane Ouattara (born 1942), Ivorian politician
 Alima Ouattara (born 1988), Ivorian pole vaulter
 Amara Ahmed Ouattara (born 1983), Burkinabé footballer
 Billy Ouattara (born 1992), Ghanaian/French basketball player
 Boureima Ouattara (born 1984), Burkinabé footballer
 Djibril Ouattara (born 1999), Burkinabé footballer
 Fambaré Ouattara Natchaba (born 1945), Togolese politician
 Guimbi Ouattara (1836–1919), ruler of Bobo-Dioulasso
 Issouf Ouattara (born 1988), Burkinabé footballer
 Kouamé Ouattara (born 1991), Ivorian footballer
 Mama Ouattara (1951–2004), Ivorian footballer
 Moussa Ouattara (disambiguation)
 Morou Ouattara, Chef
 Soumaïla Ouattara (born 1995), Burkinabé footballer
 Téné Birahima Ouattara, Ivorian politician and brother of Alassane
 Yakuba Ouattara (born 1992), Ghanaian-French basketball player

Given name 
 Ouattara Lagazane (born 1963), Ivorian sprinter
 Ouattara Watts (born 1957), Ivorian painter

Senufo surnames
Dyula surnames
Surnames of Burkinabé origin